Mark Petty (born October 16, 1969) is an American former stock car racing driver from Randleman, North Carolina. He is the nephew of Richard Petty. He began competing in NASCAR Craftsman Truck Series in 2000 events in his career, earning one top-ten. He worked as a chassis specialist for Red Horse Racing.

References

External links
 

NASCAR drivers
1969 births
Living people
People from Randleman, North Carolina
Racing drivers from North Carolina